Lasiochlamys is a genus of flowering plants endemic to New Caledonia in the family Salicaceae. Molecular phylogenetic analysis suggest that Lasiochlamys may be nested in the more widespread genus Xylosma.

Selected species
 Lasiochlamys cordifolia Sleumer
 Lasiochlamys coriacea Sleumer
 Lasiochlamys fasciculata (Guillaumin) Sleumer
 Lasiochlamys hurlimannii (Guillaumin) Sleumer
 Lasiochlamys koghiensis (Guillaumin) Sleumer
 Lasiochlamys mandjeliana Sleumer
 Lasiochlamys planchonellifolia (Guillaumin) Sleumer
 Lasiochlamys pseudocoriacea Sleumer
 Lasiochlamys reticulata (Schltr.) Pax & K.Hoffm.
 Lasiochlamys rivularis Sleumer
 Lasiochlamys trichostemona (Guillaumin) Sleumer

References

 
Endemic flora of New Caledonia
Taxonomy articles created by Polbot
Salicaceae genera